Vasil Uladzimiravič Bykaŭ (often spelled Vasil Bykov) (19 June 1924 – 22 June 2003) was a prolific Soviet and Belarusian author of novels and novellas about World War II and a significant figure in Soviet and Belarusian literature and civic thought. His work earned him endorsements for the Nobel Prize nomination from, among others, Nobel Prize laureates Joseph Brodsky and Czesław Miłosz.

Life and career
Vasil Bykaŭ was born in the village Byčki, not far from Viciebsk in 1924. In 1941 he was in Ukraine when Germany attacked the USSR. Seventeen-year-old Bykaŭ was drafted into the Red Army, where he was assigned to digging trenches. As the war progressed, he later joined the fight against the Germans, rising to the rank of junior lieutenant. After the war, Bykau was demobilized, but later returned to the Red Army, serving from 1949-1955. He then began work as a journalist for the Hrodna Pravda newspaper. In the same decade his first novellas began to be published, of which the most famous are "The Ordeal", "The Obelisk", "To Go and Not Return", and "To Live Till Sunrise". "The Ordeal" inspired director Larisa Shepitko's film The Ascent, released in 1977 and winner of the Golden Bear award at the 27th Berlin International Film Festival. During and after Perestroika, he participated in the pro-reform movement (e.g. Popular Front of Belarus). In October 1993, he signed the Letter of Forty-Two.

Bykaŭ's literary achievement lies in his sternly realistic, albeit touched by lyricism, depictions of World War II battles, typically with a small number of characters. In the ferociousness of encounter they face moral dilemmas both vis-a-vis their enemies and within their own Soviet world burdened by ideological and political constraints. This approach brought vicious accusations of "false humanism" from some Red Army generals and the Communist Party press. Other reviews praised the uncompromising writing. "Vasil Bykov is a very courageous and uncompromising writer, rather of the Solzhenitsyn stamp," wrote Michael Glenny in Partisan Review in 1972. Bykaŭ was one of the most admired writers in the Soviet Union. In 1980 he was awarded the honorific title of People's Writer of the Byelorussian SSR. 

Several of Bykaŭ's novellas are available in English, such as "The Dead Feel No Pain" (1965), "The Ordeal" (1970), "Wolf Pack" (1975) and "Sign of Misfortune". However, most of the translations were done on the basis of Russian rendering. Bykaŭ wrote all of his works in his native Belarusian language, and translated several of them into Russian by himself. Vasil Bykaŭ's status in his home country remains enormous. An opponent of Alexander Lukashenko's regime and a supporter of the Belarusian Popular Front, he lived abroad for several years (first in Finland, then in Germany and the Czech Republic), but returned to his homeland a month before his death in 2003. The memory of his turbulent life and uncompromising stance on the war have only enhanced his reputation at home and abroad ever since.

Awards 

 Order of the Red Star (1944)
 Jakub Kolas State Prize of the Belarusian SSR (for the story "The Third Rocket", 1964)
 Order of the Red Banner of Labour (1974)
 USSR State Prize (for To Live till Sunrise, 1974)
 Jakub Kolas State Prize of the Belarusian SSR (for the story "Wolf Pack", "His battalion", 1978)
People's Writer of the Belarusian SSR (1980)
 Hero of Socialist Labour (1984)
 Order of Lenin (1984)
 Order of the Patriotic War, 1st class (1985)
 Lenin Prize (for Sign of Misfortune, 1986)
 Order of Friendship of Peoples (1994)
 Order of Francysk Skaryna (Belarus, 1994)
 San-Valentino International Golden Prize (1998).

Bibliography 

 1960 – "Crane's Cry" ("Жураўліны крык")
 1960 – "Knight move" ("Ход канём")
 1962 – "Third Rocket" ("Трэцяя ракета")
 1964 – "The Alpine Ballad" ("Альпійская балада")
 1965 – "One Night" ("Адна ноч") 
 1970 – "The Ordeal" ("Ліквідацыя" ["Liquidation"]; originally published as "Сотнікаў" ["Sotnikov"])
 1971 – "The Obelisk" ("Абеліск")
 1973 – "To Live till Sunrise" ("Дажыць да світання")
 1974 – "Wolf Pack" ("Воўчая зграя")
 1975 – "His Battalion" ("Яго батальён") 
 1978 – "To Go and not Return" ("Пайсці і не вярнуцца")
 1983 – "Sign of Misfortune" ("Знак бяды")
 1989 – "In the Fog" ("У тумане")
 1997 – "The Wall" ("Сцяна")
 2003 – "The Long Road Home" ("Доўгая дарога да дому")

See also
The Wall
On Black Ice, 1995 film basing on short stories by Vasil Bykaŭ
In the Fog, 2012 film based on Bykaŭ's 1989 story of the same name

References

External links

Vasil Bykaŭ (in Belarusian, Russian, and English)
Vasil Bykaŭ's works on-line 
Vasil Bykaŭ, 79, Belarusian Novelist // The New York Times

Vasil Bykov  on the Official Website of the Republic of Belarus 

1924 births
2003 deaths
People from Ushachy District
Members of the Congress of People's Deputies of the Soviet Union
Members of the Supreme Soviet of the Byelorussian SSR (1975–1979)
Members of the Supreme Soviet of the Byelorussian SSR (1980–1985)
Members of the Supreme Soviet of the Byelorussian SSR (1985–1990)
Heroes of Socialist Labour
Lenin Prize winners
People's Writers of the Byelorussian SSR
Recipients of the Byelorussian SSR State Prize
Recipients of the Order of Francysk Skaryna
Recipients of the Order of Friendship of Peoples
Recipients of the Order of Lenin
Recipients of the Order of the Red Banner of Labour
Recipients of the Order of the Red Star
Recipients of the USSR State Prize
Soviet military personnel of World War II
Belarusian partisans
Soviet partisans
Belarusian male writers
Soviet male writers
Deaths from stomach cancer